Juan Manuel José Domingo Ortiz de Rosas (30 March 1793 – 14 March 1877), nicknamed "Restorer of the Laws", was an Argentine politician and army officer who ruled Buenos Aires Province and briefly the Argentine Confederation. Although born into a wealthy family, Rosas independently amassed a personal fortune, acquiring large tracts of land in the process. Rosas enlisted his workers in a private militia, as was common for rural proprietors, and took part in the disputes that led to numerous civil wars in his country. Victorious in warfare, personally influential, and with vast landholdings and a loyal private army, Rosas became a caudillo, as provincial warlords in the region were known. He eventually reached the rank of brigadier general, the highest in the Argentine Army, and became the undisputed leader of the Federalist Party.

In December 1829, Rosas became governor of the province of Buenos Aires and established a dictatorship backed by state terrorism. In 1831, he signed the Federal Pact, recognising provincial autonomy and creating the Argentine Confederation. When his term of office ended in 1832, Rosas departed to the frontier to wage war on the indigenous peoples. After his supporters launched a coup in Buenos Aires, Rosas was asked to return and once again took office as governor. Rosas reestablished his dictatorship and formed the repressive Mazorca, an armed parapolice that killed thousands of citizens. Elections became a farce, and the legislature and judiciary became docile instruments of his will. Rosas created a cult of personality and his regime became totalitarian in nature, with all aspects of society rigidly controlled.

Rosas faced many threats to his power during the late 1830s and early 1840s. He fought a war against the Peru–Bolivian Confederation, endured a blockade by France, faced a revolt in his own province and battled a major rebellion that lasted for years and spread to five northern Argentine provinces. Rosas persevered and extended his influence in the provinces, exercising effective control over them through direct and indirect means. By 1848, he had extended his power beyond the borders of Buenos Aires and was ruler of all of Argentina. Rosas also attempted to annex the neighbouring nations of Uruguay and Paraguay. France and Great Britain jointly retaliated against Argentine expansionism, blockading Buenos Aires for most of the late 1840s, but were unable to halt Rosas, whose prestige was greatly enhanced by his string of successes.

When the Empire of Brazil began aiding Uruguay in its struggle against Argentina, Rosas declared war in August 1851, starting the Platine War. This short conflict ended with Rosas being defeated and absconding to Britain. His last years were spent in exile living as a tenant farmer until his death in 1877. Rosas garnered an enduring public perception among Argentines as a brutal tyrant. Since the 1930s, an authoritarian, anti-Semitic, and racist political movement in Argentina called Revisionism has tried to improve Rosas's reputation and establish a new dictatorship in the model of his regime. In 1989, his remains were repatriated by the government in an attempt to promote national unity, seeking to rehabilitate Rosas and the 1970s military dictatorship. Rosas remains a controversial figure in Argentina in the 21st century.

Early life

Birth

Juan Manuel José Domingo Ortiz de Rosas was born on 30 March 1793 at his family's town house in Buenos Aires, the capital of the Viceroyalty of the Río de la Plata. He was the first child of León Ortiz de Rosas and Agustina López de Osornio.  León Ortiz was the son of an immigrant from the Spanish Province of Burgos. A military officer with an undistinguished career, León Ortiz had married into a wealthy Criollo family. The young Juan Manuel de Rosas's character was heavily influenced by his mother Agustina, a strong-willed and domineering woman who derived these character traits from her father Clemente López de Osornio, a landowner who died defending his estate from an Indian attack in 1783.

As was common practice at the time, Rosas was schooled at home until the age of 8, and then enrolled in what was regarded the best private school in Buenos Aires. Though befitting the son of a wealthy landowner, his education was unremarkable. According to historian John Lynch, Rosas' education "was supplemented by his own efforts in the years that followed. Rosas was not entirely unread, though the time, the place, and his own bias limited the choice of authors. He appears to have had a sympathetic, if superficial, acquaintance with minor political thinkers of French absolutism."

In 1806, a British expeditionary force invaded Buenos Aires. A 13-year-old Rosas served distributing ammunition to troops in a force organised by Viceroy Santiago Liniers to counter the invasion. The British were defeated in August 1806, but returned a year later. Rosas was then assigned to the Caballería de los Migueletes (a militia cavalry), although he was probably barred from active duty during this time due to illness.

Estanciero

After the British invasions had been repelled, Rosas and his family moved from Buenos Aires to their estancia (ranch). His work there further shaped his character and outlook as part of the Platine region's social establishment. In the Viceroyalty of the Río de la Plata, owners of large landholdings (including the Rosas family) provided food, equipment and protection for families living in areas under their control. Their private defence forces consisted primarily of labourers who were drafted as soldiers. Most of these peons, as such workers were called, were gauchos.

The landed aristocracy of Spanish descent considered the illiterate, mixed-race gauchos, who comprised the majority of the population, to be ungovernable and untrustworthy. The gauchos were tolerated because there was no other labour force available, but were treated with contempt by the landowners. Rosas got along well with the gauchos in his service, despite his harsh, authoritarian temperament. He was known to dress like them, joke with them, take part in their horse-play, and pay them well, but he never allowed them to forget that he was their master rather than their equal. Shaped by the colonial society in which he lived, Rosas was conservative, an advocate of hierarchy and authority, like the other great landowners in the region.

Rosas acquired a working knowledge of administering ranch lands and, beginning in 1811, took charge of his family's estancias. In 1813, he married Encarnación Ezcurra, daughter of a wealthy family from Buenos Aires. He soon afterwards sought to establish a career for himself, leaving his parents' estate. He produced salted meat and acquired landholdings in the process. As the years passed he became an estanciero (rancher) in his own right, accumulating land while establishing a successful partnership with second cousins from the politically powerful Anchorena clan. His hard work and organisational skills in deploying labour were key to his success, rather than creating new or applying nontraditional approaches to production.

Rise to power

Caudillo

The May Revolution of 1810 marked the early stage of a process which later led to the disintegration of Spain's Viceroyalty of the Río de la Plata, independence and the eventual formation of Argentina. Rosas, like many landowners in the countryside, was suspicious of a movement advanced primarily by merchants and bureaucrats in the city of Buenos Aires. Rosas was specially outraged by the execution of Viceroy Santiago de Liniers at the hands of the revolutionaries. Rosas felt nostalgic about colonial times, seeing them as stable, orderly and prosperous.

When the Congress of Tucumán severed all remaining ties with Spain in July 1816, Rosas and his peers accepted independence as an accomplished fact. Independence resulted in a breakup of the territories that had formed the Viceroyalty of the Río de la Plata. The province of Buenos Aires fought a civil war with the other provinces over the degree of autonomy which the provincial governments were to have. The Unitarian Party supported the preeminence of Buenos Aires, while the Federalist Party defended provincial autonomy. A decade of strife over the issue destroyed the ties between capital and provinces, with new republics being declared throughout the country. Efforts by the Buenos Aires government to quash these independent states were met with determined local resistance. In 1820 Rosas and his gauchos, all dressed in red and nicknamed "Colorados del Monte" ("Reds of the Mount"), enlisted in the army of Buenos Aires as the Fifth Regiment of Militia. They repulsed invading provincial armies, saving Buenos Aires.

At the end of the conflict, Rosas returned to his estancias having acquired prestige for his military service. He was promoted to cavalry colonel and was awarded further landholdings by the government. These additions, together with his successful business and fresh property acquisitions, greatly boosted his wealth. With his newly gained influence, military background, vast landholdings and a private army of gauchos loyal only to him, Rosas became the quintessential caudillo, as provincial warlords in the region were known.

Governor of Buenos Aires

National unity crumbled under the weight of a continuous round of civil wars, rebellions and coups. The Unitarian–Federalist struggle brought perennial instability while caudillos fought for power and laid waste to the countryside. By 1826, Rosas had built a power base, consisting of relatives, friends and clients, and joined the Federalist Party. He remained a strong  advocate of his native province of Buenos Aires, with little concern for political ideology. In 1820, Rosas fought alongside the Unitarians because he saw the Federalist invasion as a menace to Buenos Aires. When the Unitarians sought to appease the Federalists by proposing to grant the other provinces a share in the customs revenues flowing through Buenos Aires, Rosas saw this as a threat to his province's interests. In 1827, four provinces led by Federalist caudillos rebelled against the Unitarian government. Rosas was the driving force behind the Federalist takeover of Buenos Aires and the election of Manuel Dorrego as provincial governor that year. Rosas was awarded with the post of general commander of the rural militias of the province of Buenos Aires on 14 July, which increased his influence and power.

In December 1828 Juan Lavalle, the Unitarian governor of Buenos Aires had Dorrego seized and executed without trial. With Dorrego gone, Rosas filled the vacant Federalist leadership and rebelled against the Unitarians. He allied with Estanislao López, caudillo and ruler of Santa Fe Province, and they defeated Lavalle at the Battle of Márquez Bridge in April 1829. When Rosas entered the city of Buenos Aires in November of that year, he was hailed both as a victorious military leader and as the head of the Federalists. Charles Darwin, who met Rosas during the Beagle survey expedition, assessed him as "a man of extraordinary character". British diplomat Henry Southern said that in "appearance Rosas resembles an English gentleman farmer—his manners are courteous without being refined. He is affable and agreeable in conversation, which however nearly always turns on himself, but his tone is pleasant and agreeable enough. His memory is stupendous: and his accuracy in all points of detail never failing."

On 6 December 1829, the House of Representatives of Buenos Aires elected Rosas governor and granted him facultades extraordinarias (extraordinary powers). This marked the beginning of his regime, described by historians as a dictatorship. He saw himself as a benevolent dictator, saying: "For me the ideal of good government would be paternal autocracy, intelligent, disinterested and indefatigable ... I have always admired the autocratic dictators who have been the first servants of their people. That is my great title: I have always sought to serve the country." He used his power to censor his critics and banish his enemies. He later justified these measures, stating: "When I took over the government I found the government in anarchy, divided into warring factions, reduced to pure chaos, a hell in miniature ..."

Desert Campaign

Rosas' early administration was preoccupied with the severe deficits, large public debts and the impact of currency devaluation which his government inherited. A great drought that began in December 1828, which would last until April 1832, greatly impacted the economy. The Unitarians were still at large, controlling several provinces that had banded together in the Unitarian League. The capture of José María Paz, the main Unitarian leader, in March 1831 resulted in the end of the Unitarian–Federalist civil war and the collapse of the Unitarian League. Rosas was content, for the moment, to agree to recognize provincial autonomy in the Federal Pact. In an effort to alleviate the government's financial problems, he improved revenue collection while not raising taxes and curtailed expenditure.

By the end of his first term, Rosas was generally credited with having staved off political and financial instability, but he faced increased opposition in the House of Representatives. All members of the House were Federalists, as Rosas had restored the legislature that had been in place under Dorrego, and which had subsequently been dissolved by Lavalle. A liberal Federalist faction, which accepted dictatorship as a temporary necessity, called for the adoption of a constitution. Rosas was unwilling to govern constrained by a constitutional framework and only grudgingly relinquished his dictatorial powers. His term of office ended soon after, on 5 December 1832.

While the government in Buenos Aires was distracted with political infighting, ranchers began moving into territories in the south inhabited by indigenous peoples. The resulting conflict with native peoples necessitated a government response. Rosas steadfastly endorsed policies which supported this expansion. During his governorship he granted lands in the south to war veterans and to ranchers seeking alternative pasture lands during the drought. Although the south was regarded as a virtual desert at the time, it had great potential and resources for agricultural development, particularly for ranching operations. The government gave Rosas command of an army with orders to subdue the Indian tribes in the coveted territory. Rosas was generous to those Indians who surrendered, rewarding them with animals and goods. Although he personally disliked killing Indians, he relentlessly hunted those who refused to yield. The Desert Campaign lasted from 1833 to 1834, with Rosas subjugating the entire region. His conquest of the south opened many possibilities for further territorial expansion, which led him to state: "The fine territories, which extend from the Andes to the coast and down to the Magellan Straits are now wide open for our children."

Second governorship

Absolute power

While Rosas was away on the Desert Campaign in October 1833, a group of Rosistas (Rosas's supporters) laid siege to Buenos Aires. Inside the city, Rosas's wife, Encarnación, assembled a contingent of associates to aid the besiegers. The Revolution of the Restorers, as the Rosista coup came to be known, forced the provincial governor Juan Ramón Balcarce to resign. In quick succession, Balcarce was followed by two others who presided over weak and ineffective governments. The Rosismo (Rosism) had become a powerful faction within the Federalist Party, and pressured other factions to accept a return of Rosas, endowed with dictatorial powers, as the only way to restore stability. The House of Representatives yielded, and on 7 March 1835, Rosas was reelected governor and invested with the suma del poder público (sum of public power).

A plebiscite was held to determine whether the citizens of Buenos Aires supported Rosas's reelection and resumption of dictatorial powers. During his governorship from 1829 to 1832, Rosas had reduced the election process to a farce.  He had installed loyal associates as justices of the peace, powerful officeholders with administrative and judicial functions who were also charged with tax collection, leading militia and presiding over elections. Through the exclusion of voters and intimidation of the opposition, the justices of the peace delivered any result Rosas favored. Half of the members of the House of Representatives faced reelection each year, and the opposition to Rosas had quickly been eliminated through rigged elections, allowing him to control the legislature. Control over finances had been stripped from the legislature, and its approval of legislation turned into a rubber stamp to preserve a semblance of democracy. The result of the 1835 election was a predictable 99.9 percent "yes" vote.

Rosas believed that the manipulation of elections were necessary for political stability, because most of the country's population was illiterate. He acquired absolute power over the province with the assent and support of most estancieros and businessmen, who shared his views. The estancia formed the power base on which Rosas relied. Lynch said that there "was a great deal of group cohesion and solidarity among the landed class. Rosas was the center of a vast kinship group based on land. He was surrounded by a closely knit economic and political network linking deputies, law officers, officials, and military who were also landowners and related among themselves or with Rosas."

Totalitarian regime

Rosas's authority and influence spread far beyond the House of Representatives. He exercised tight control over the bureaucracy as well as his cabinet, stating: "Do not imagine that my Ministers are anything but my Secretaries. I put them in their offices to listen and report, and nothing more." His supporters were rewarded with positions within the state apparatus, and anyone he deemed a threat was purged. Opposition newspapers were burned in public squares. Rosas created an elaborate cult of personality, presenting himself as an almighty and fatherlike figure who protected the people. His portraits were carried in street demonstrations and placed on church altars to be venerated. Rosismo was no longer a mere faction within the Federalist ranks; it had become a political movement. As early as 1829, Rosas had confided to an Uruguayan diplomatic envoy: "I tell you I am not a Federalist, and I have never belonged to that party." During his governorship, he still claimed to have favoured Federalism against Unitarianism, although in practice Federalism had by that time been subsumed into the Rosismo movement.

Rosas established a totalitarian regime, in which the government sought to dictate every aspect of public and private life. It was mandated that the slogan "Death to the Savage Unitarians" be inscribed at the head of all official documents. Anyone on the state payroll—from military officers, priests, to civil servants and teachers—was obliged to wear a red badge with the inscription "Federation or Death". Every male was required to have a "federal look", i.e., to sport a large moustache and sideburns, leading many to wear false moustaches. The red colour—symbol of both the Federalist Party and of Rosismo—became omnipresent in the province of Buenos Aires. Soldiers wore red chiripás (blankets worn as trousers), caps and jackets, and their horses sported red accoutrements. Civilians were also required to wear the colour. A red waistcoat, red badge and red hat band were required for men, while women wore ribbons in that colour and children donned school uniforms based upon Rosismo paradigms. Building exteriors and interiors were also decorated in red.

Most Catholic clergy in Buenos Aires willingly backed Rosas' regime. The Jesuits, the only ones who refused to do so, were expelled from the country. The lower social strata in Buenos Aires, which formed the vast majority of its populace, experienced no improvement in the conditions under which they lived. When Rosas slashed expenditures, he cut resources from education, social services, general welfare and public works. None of the lands confiscated from Indians and Unitarians were turned over to rural workers, including gauchos. Black people did not experience any improvement in their conditions either. Rosas was a slave-owner, and helped revive the slave trade. Despite doing little to promote their interests, he remained popular among blacks and gauchos. He employed blacks, patronized their festivities and attended their candombles. The gauchos admired his leadership and willingness to fraternize with them to some extent.

State terrorism

In addition to purges, banishments and censorship, Rosas took measures against the opposition and anyone else he deemed a threat that historians have considered state terrorism. Terror was a tool used to intimidate dissident voices, to shore up support among his own partisans and to exterminate his foes. His targets were denounced, sometimes inaccurately, as having ties to Unitarians. Those victimised included members of his government and party who were suspected of being insufficiently loyal. If actual opponents were not at hand, the regime found other targets that were punished to make an example. A climate of fear was used to create unquestioning conformity to Rosas' dictates.

State terrorism was carried out by the Mazorca, an armed parapolice unit of the Sociedad Popular Restauradora political organization. The Sociedad Popular Restauradora and the Mazorca were creations of Rosas, who retained tight control over both. The tactics of the mazorqueros included neighborhood sweeps in which houses would be searched and occupants intimidated. Others who fell into their power were arrested, tortured and killed. Killings were generally by shooting, lance-thrusting or throat-slitting. Many were castrated, or had their beards scalped or their tongues cut out. Modern estimates report around 2,000 people were killed from 1829 until 1852.

Although a judicial system still existed in Buenos Aires, Rosas removed any independence the courts might have exercised, either by controlling appointments to the judiciary, or by circumventing their authority entirely. He would sit in judgement over cases, issuing sentences which included fines, service in the army, imprisonment, or execution. The exercise of state terror as a tool of intimidation was restricted to Rosas himself; his subordinates had no control over it. It was used against specific targets, rather than randomly. Terrorism was orchestrated rather than a product of popular zeal, was targeted for effect rather than indiscriminate. Anarchic demonstrations, vigilantism and disorderliness were antithetical to a regime touting a law and order agenda. Foreigners were exempted from abuses, as were people too poor or inconsequential to serve as effective examples. Victims were selected for their usefulness as tools of intimidation.

Struggle for dominance

Rebellions and foreign threat

Throughout the late 1830s and early 1840s, Rosas faced a series of major threats to his power. The Unitarians found an ally in Andrés de Santa Cruz, the ruler of the Peru–Bolivian Confederation. Rosas declared war against the Peru–Bolivian Confederation on 19 March 1837, joining the War of the Confederation between Chile and Peru–Bolivia. The Rosista army played a minor role in the conflict, which resulted in the overthrow of Santa Cruz and the dissolution of the Peru–Bolivian Confederation. On 28 March 1838, France declared a blockade of the Port of Buenos Aires, eager to extend its influence over the region. Unable to confront the French, Rosas increased internal repression to forestall potential uprisings against his regime.

The blockade caused severe damage to the economy across all the provinces, as they exported their goods through the port of Buenos Aires. Despite the 1831 Federal Pact, all provinces had long been discontent with the de facto primacy that Buenos Aires province held over them. On 28 February 1839, the province of Corrientes revolted and attacked both Buenos Aires and Entre Ríos provinces. Rosas counterattacked and defeated the rebels, killing their leader, the governor of Corrientes. In June, Rosas uncovered a plot by dissident Rosistas to oust him from power in what became known as the Maza conspiracy. Rosas imprisoned some of the plotters and executed others. Manuel Vicente Maza, president of both the House of Representatives and the Supreme Court, was murdered by Rosas's Mazorca agents within the halls of the parliament on the pretext that his son was involved in the conspiracy. In the countryside, estancieros, including a younger brother of Rosas, revolted, beginning the Rebellion of the South. The rebels attempted to ally with France, but were easily crushed, many losing their lives and properties in the process.

In September 1839, Juan Lavalle returned after ten years in exile. He allied with the governor of Corrientes, which revolted once again, and invaded Buenos Aires province at the head of Unitarian troops armed and supplied by the French. Emboldened by Lavalle's actions, the provinces of Tucumán, Salta, La Rioja, Catamarca and Jujuy formed the Coalition of the North and also rebelled against Buenos Aires. Great Britain intervened on behalf of Rosas, and France lifted the blockade on 29 October 1840. The struggle with his internal enemies was hard-fought. By December 1842, Lavalle had been killed and the rebellious provinces subdued, except for Corrientes, which was only defeated in 1847. Terrorism was also employed on the battlefield, as the Rosistas refused to take prisoners. The defeated men had their throats cut and their heads put on display.

Ruler of Argentina

Around 1845, Rosas managed to establish absolute dominance over the region. He exercised complete control over all aspects of society with the solid backing of the army. Rosas was raised from colonel to brigadier general (the highest army rank) on 18 December 1829. On 12 November 1840 he declined the newly created and higher rank of grand marshal (gran mariscal), which had been bestowed on him by the House of Representatives. The army was led by officers who had backgrounds and values similar to his. Confident of his power, Rosas made some concessions by returning confiscated properties to their owners, disbanding the Mazorca and ending torture and political assassinations. The inhabitants of Buenos Aires still dressed and behaved according to the set of rules Rosas had imposed, but the climate of constant and widespread fear greatly diminished.

When Rosas was elected governor for the first time in 1829, he held no power outside the province of Buenos Aires. There was no national government or national parliament. The former Viceroyalty of the Río de la Plata had been succeeded by the United Provinces of the Río de la Plata, which by 1831, following the Federal Pact and officially from 22 May 1835, had increasingly been known as the Argentine Confederation, or simply, Argentina. Rosas's victory over the other Argentine provinces in the early 1840s turned them into satellites of Buenos Aires. He gradually put in place provincial governors who were either allied or too weak to have real independence, which allowed him to exercise dominance over all the provinces. By 1848, Rosas began calling his government the "government of the confederacy" and the "general government", which would have been inconceivable a few years before. The next year, with acquiescence of the provinces, he named himself "Supreme Head of the Confederacy" and became the indisputable ruler of Argentina.

As Rosas aged and his health declined, the question of who would succeed him became a growing concern among his supporters. His wife Encarnación had died in October 1838 after a long illness. Although devastated by his loss, Rosas exploited her death to raise support for his regime. Not long after, at the age of 47, he began an affair with his fifteen-year-old maid, María Eugenia Castro, with whom he had five illegitimate children. From his marriage to Encarnación, Rosas had two children: Juan Bautista Pedro and Manuela Robustiana. Rosas established a hereditary dictatorship, naming the children from his marriage as his successors, stating that "[t]hey are both worthy children of my beloved Encarnación, and if, God willing, I die, then you will find that they are capable of succeeding me." It is unknown whether Rosas was a closet monarchist. Later during his exile, Rosas declared that Princess Alice of the United Kingdom would be the ideal ruler for his country. Nonetheless, in public he stated that his regime was republican in nature.

Apogee and downfall

Anglo-French blockade

The breakup of the old Viceroyalty of the Río de la Plata during the 1810s eventually resulted in the emergence of independent nations of Paraguay, Bolivia and Uruguay in the northern portion of the Viceroyalty, while its southern territories coalesced into the United Provinces of the Río de la Plata. Rosas planned to restore, if not all, at least a considerable part of the former borders of the old Viceroyalty of the Río de la Plata. He never recognized the independence of Paraguay and regarded it a rebel Argentine province that would inevitably be reconquered. He sent an army under Manuel Oribe who invaded Uruguay and conquered most of the country, except for its capital Montevideo that endured a long siege starting in 1843. When pressed by the British, Rosas declined to guarantee Uruguayan independence. In South America, all potential foreign threats to Rosas's plans of conquest collapsed, including Gran Colombia and the Peru–Bolivian Confederation, or were troubled by internal turmoil, as was the Empire of Brazil. To reinforce his claims over Uruguay and Paraguay, and maintain his dominance over the Argentine provinces, Rosas blockaded the port of Montevideo and closed the interior rivers to foreign trade.

The loss of trade was unacceptable to Britain and France. On 17 September 1845 both nations established the Anglo-French blockade of the Río de la Plata and enforced the free navigation in the Río de la Plata Basin (or Platine region). Argentina resisted the pressure and fought back to a standstill. This undeclared war caused more economic harm to France and Britain than to Argentina. The British faced increasing pressure at home once they realised that the access gained to the other ports within the Platine region did not compensate for the loss of trade with Buenos Aires. Britain ended all hostilities and lifted the blockade on 15 July 1847, followed by France on 12 June 1848. Rosas had successfully resisted the two most powerful nations on Earth; his standing, and Argentina's, increased among Hispanic American nations. The Venezuelan humanist Andrés Bello, summarizing the prevailing opinion, considered Rosas among "the leading ranks of the great men of America".

Although his prestige was on the rise, Rosas made no serious attempts to further liberalise his regime. Every year he presented his resignation and the pliant House of Representatives predictably declined, claiming that maintaining him in office was vital for the nation's welfare. Rosas also allowed exiled Argentines to return to their homeland, but only because he was so confident of his control and that no one was willing to risk defying him. The execution in August 1848 of the pregnant Camila O'Gorman, charged with a forbidden romance with a priest, caused a backlash throughout the continent. Nonetheless, it served as a clear warning that Rosas had no intention of loosening his grip.

Platine War

Rosas failed to realize that discontent was steadily growing throughout the country. Throughout the 1840s he became increasingly secluded in his country house in Palermo, some miles away from Buenos Aires. There he ruled and lived under heavy protection provided by guards and patrols. He declined to meet with his ministers and relied solely on secretaries. His daughter Manuela replaced his wife at his right hand and became the link between Rosas and the outside world. The reason for Rosas's increasing isolation was given by a member of his secretariat: "The dictator is not stupid: he knows the people hate him; he goes in constant fear and always has one eye on the chance to rob and abuse them and the other on making a getaway. He has a horse ready saddled at the door of his office day and night".

Meanwhile, Brazil, now ascendant under Emperor Dom Pedro II, provided support to the Uruguayan government that still held out in Montevideo, as well as to the ambitious Justo José de Urquiza, a caudillo in Entre Ríos who rebelled against Rosas. Once one of Rosas' most trusted lieutenants, Urquiza now claimed to fight for a constitutional government, although his ambition to become head of state was barely disguised. In retaliation, Rosas declared war on Brazil on 18 August 1851, beginning the Platine War. The army under Oribe in Uruguay surrendered to Urquiza in October. With arms and financial aid given by Brazil, Urquiza then marched through Argentine territory heading to Buenos Aires.

Uncharacteristically, Rosas remained passive throughout the conflict. The Argentine ruler lost heart once he realized that he had fallen into a trap. Even if he defeated Urquiza, his forces would probably be weakened enough to prevent him from challenging the Brazilian army that was ready to invade Argentina. With no other alternative, Rosas remarked: "There is no other way; we have to play for the high stakes and go for everything. Here we are, and from here there is no retreat." After an unsuccessful battle against Urquiza on 3 February 1852, Rosas fled to Buenos Aires. Once there, he disguised himself and boarded a ship that took him to Britain to live in exile. Embittered, he remarked: "It is not the people who have overthrown me. It is the monkeys, the Brazilians."

Later years

Exile and death

Rosas arrived in Plymouth, Great Britain, on 26 April 1852. The British gave him asylum, paid for his travel and welcomed him with a 21-gun salute. These honours were granted because, according to the British Foreign Secretary James Harris, 3rd Earl of Malmesbury, "General Rosas was no common refugee, but one who had shown great distinction and kindness to the British merchants who had traded with his country". Months before his fall, Rosas had arranged with the British chargé d'affaires Captain Robert Gore for protection and asylum in the event of his defeat. Both his children by Encarnación followed him into exile, although Juan Bautista soon returned with his family to Argentina. His daughter Manuela married the son of an old associate of Rosas, an act which the former dictator never forgave. A domineering father, Rosas wanted his daughter to remain devoted to him alone. Although he forbade her from writing or visiting, Manuela remained loyal to him and maintained contact.

The new Argentine government confiscated all of Rosas' properties and tried him as a criminal, later sentencing him to death. Rosas was appalled that most of his friends, supporters and allies abandoned him and became either silent or openly critical of him. Rosismo vanished overnight. "The landed class, supporters and beneficiaries of Rosas, now had to make their peace—and their profits—with his successors. Survival, not allegiance, was their politics", argued Lynch. Urquiza, a one-time ally and later an enemy, reconciled with Rosas and sent him financial assistance, hoping for political support in return—although Rosas had scant political capital left. Rosas followed Argentina's developments while in exile, always hoping for an opportunity to return, but he never again insinuated himself into Argentine affairs.

In exile Rosas was not destitute, but he lived modestly amid financial constraints during the remainder of his life. A very few loyal friends sent him money, but it was never enough. He sold one of his estancias before the confiscation and became a tenant farmer in Swaythling, near Southampton. He employed a housekeeper and two to four labourers, to whom he paid above-average wages. Despite constant concern over his shortage of funds, Rosas found joy in farm life, once remarking: "I now consider myself happy on this farm, living in modest circumstances as you see, earning a living the hard way by the sweat of my brow". A contemporary described him in final years: "He was then eighty, a man still handsome and imposing; his manners were most refined, and the modest environment did nothing to lessen his air of a great lord, inherited from his family." After a walk on a cold day, Rosas caught pneumonia and died at 07:00 on the morning of 14 March 1877. Following a private mass attended by his family and a few friends, he was buried in the town cemetery of Southampton.

Legacy

Serious attempts to reassess Rosas's reputation began in the 1880s with the publication of scholarly works by Adolfo Saldías and Ernesto Quesada. Later, a more blatant "Revisionist" movement would flourish under Nacionalismo (Nationalism). Nacionalismo was a political movement that appeared in Argentina in the 1920s and reached its apex in the 1930s. It was the Argentine equivalent of the authoritarian ideologies that arose during the same period, such as Nazism, Fascism and Integralism. Argentine Nationalism was an authoritarian, anti-Semitic, racist and misogynistic political movement with support for racially based pseudo-scientific theories such as eugenics. Revisionismo (Revisionism) was the historiographical wing of Argentine Nacionalismo. The main goal of Argentine Nacionalismo was to establish a national dictatorship. For the Nacionalismo movement, Rosas and his regime were idealized and portrayed as paragons of governmental virtue. Revisionismo served as a useful tool, as the main purpose of the revisionists within the Nacionalismo agenda was to rehabilitate Rosas's image.

Despite a decades-long struggle, Revisionismo failed to be taken seriously. According to Michael Goebel, the revisionists had a "lack of interest in scholarly standards" and were known for "their institutional marginality in the intellectual field". They also never succeeded in changing mainstream views regarding Rosas. William Spence Robertson said in 1930: "Among the enigmatical personages of the 'Age of Dictators' in South America none played a more spectacular role than the Argentine dictator, Juan Manuel de Rosas, whose gigantic and ominous figure bestrode the Plata River for more than twenty years. So despotic was his power that Argentine writers have themselves styled this age of their history as 'The Tyranny of Rosas'." In 1961, William Dusenberry said: "Rosas is a negative memory in Argentina. He left behind him the black legend of Argentine history—a legend which Argentines in general wish to forget. There is no monument to him in the entire nation; no park, plaza, or street bears his name."

In the 1980s, Argentina was a fractured, deeply divided nation, having faced military dictatorships, severe economic crises and a defeat in the Falklands War. President Carlos Menem decided to repatriate Rosas's remains and take advantage of the occasion to unite the Argentines. Menem believed that if the Argentines could forgive Rosas and his regime, they might do the same regarding the more recent and vividly remembered past. On 30 September 1989, an elaborate and enormous cortege organized by the government was held, after which the remains of the Argentine ruler were interred in his family vault at La Recoleta Cemetery, Buenos Aires. Closely allied with neorevisionists, Menem (and his fellow Peronist presidential successors Néstor Kirchner and Cristina Fernández de Kirchner) have honoured Rosas on banknotes, postage stamps and monuments, causing mixed reactions among the public. Rosas remains a controversial figure among Argentines, who "have long been fascinated and outraged" by him, as historian John Lynch noted.

Notes

References

Sources

External links

 
Governors of Buenos Aires Province
Argentine brigadiers
Federales (Argentina)
Argentine Roman Catholics
Argentine people of Spanish descent
People from Buenos Aires
Burials at La Recoleta Cemetery
1793 births
1877 deaths